James "Beetle" Bolden Jr. (born January 16, 1996) is an American professional basketball player for Lovćen 1947 of the Montenegrin League and the ABA League Second Division. He played college basketball for the West Virginia Mountaineers and the Alabama Crimson Tide.

High school career
Bolden attended Holmes High School in Covington, Kentucky. He averaged 18.5 points, 4.0 assists, 4.6 rebounds and 2.6 steals per game as a sophomore. As a junior, Bolden averaged 20.8 points, 3.9 rebounds, 3.4 assists and 1.8 steals per game and led the Bulldogs to the finals of the Ninth Region tournament before losing to eventual state champion Covington Catholic High School. As a senior, Bolden averaged 19.2 points, 4.8 rebounds and 3.9 assists per game. He was named to the First Team All-State for the third straight season. He finished his high school career with 2,024 career points. Bolden was ranked the No. 207 recruit in his class and committed to play college basketball for West Virginia over offers from Xavier, Butler, Purdue and Ohio.

College career
Bolden redshirted his true freshman season at West Virginia after tearing his ACL and spraining his MCL. As a redshirt freshman, he averaged 3.5 points per game, shooting 44.9 percent from three-point range. Bolden averaged 8.7 points, 1.9 rebounds, and 1.1 assists per game as a sophomore. On January 12, 2019, he scored a career-high 31 points in an 85–77 loss to Oklahoma State. Bolden suffered a season-ending ankle sprain on January 26, in an 83–66 loss to Tennessee. As a redshirt junior, he averaged 12.2 points, 2.6 rebounds and 2.5 assists per game, making 12 starts. Following the season, Bolden transferred to Alabama as a graduate transfer, shortly after the hiring of coach Nate Oats. Bolden averaged 8.5 points, 2.2 rebounds and 1.2 assists per game as a graduate student.

Professional career
Bolden signed with Lovćen 1947 of the Montenegrin League on August 11, 2020.

Career statistics

College

|-
| style="text-align:left;"| 2015–16
| style="text-align:left;"| West Virginia
| style="text-align:center;" colspan="11"|  Redshirt
|-
| style="text-align:left;"| 2016–17
| style="text-align:left;"| West Virginia
| 27 || 0 || 5.8 || .464 || .449 || .571 || .8 || .3 || .3 || .0 || 3.5
|-
| style="text-align:left;"| 2017–18
| style="text-align:left;"| West Virginia
| 37 || 3 || 17.2 || .429 || .411 || .837 || 1.9 || 1.1 || .9 || .2 || 8.7
|-
| style="text-align:left;"| 2018–19
| style="text-align:left;"| West Virginia
| 18 || 12 || 21.4 || .409 || .349 || .820 || 2.6 || 2.5 || 1.1 || .2 || 12.2
|-
| style="text-align:left;"| 2019–20
| style="text-align:left;"| Alabama
| 27 || 3 || 21.9 || .335 || .344 || .836 || 2.2 || 1.2 || .6 || .1 || 8.5
|- class="sortbottom"
| style="text-align:center;" colspan="2"| Career
| 109 || 18 || 16.2 || .400 || .384 || .810 || 1.8 || 1.1 || .7 || .1 || 7.9

References

External links
Alabama Crimson Tide bio
West Virginia Mountaineers bio

1996 births
Living people
American men's basketball players
Basketball players from Kentucky
West Virginia Mountaineers men's basketball players
Alabama Crimson Tide men's basketball players
People from Covington, Kentucky
Point guards